Fuchu, King of Chu, clan name Xiong, was from 227 to 223 BC the last king of the state of Chu during the late Warring States period of ancient China (though sources argue that  Lord Changping was the last king of Chu).  Fuchu was his given name and he did not receive a posthumous title.

Fuchu usurped the throne in 227 BC after he murdered his younger half-brother King Ai of Chu.  In 223 BC he was captured and deposed by the army of Qin.

References

Monarchs of Chu (state)
Chinese kings
3rd-century BC Chinese monarchs
Year of birth unknown
Year of death unknown